Subrat Pathak is an Indian politician. He was elected to the Lok Sabha, lower house of the Parliament of India from Kannauj, Uttar Pradesh defeating Dimple Yadav in the 2019 Indian general election as a member of the Bharatiya Janata Party. He is General Secretary of Bhartiya Janta Party, Uttar Pradesh.

He was former President of Bhartiya Janta Party Youth Wing Bhartiya Janta Yuva Morcha.

References

External links
 Official biographical sketch in Parliament of India website

India MPs 2019–present
Lok Sabha members from Uttar Pradesh
Living people
Bharatiya Janata Party politicians from Uttar Pradesh
People from Kannauj
1979 births